Bāb as-Sāhira Cemetery or al-Sahira Cemetery an Islamic cemetery in Jerusalem, a few meters north of the city wall's Bāb as-Sāhira ( Herod's Gate). It was previously called the Mujahideen Cemetery.

Along with Mamilla and Bāb ar-Raḥma Cemeteries, it includes graves for those in Saladin's army who died in battle (for al-fatḥ aṣ-Ṣalāḥī, "the triumph of Saladdin").

References

Cemeteries in Jerusalem